Palanjek Pokupski is a village in municipality of Lekenik in central Croatia.

History 

Ancient Roman archaeological site called Gradina is located south of the village with ceramic artifacts, bricks residues of sand and clay plaster present at the site.

World War II persecutions of local Serb population 

In night of 11 to 12 May 1941, 5 local Serbs were seized and murdered after one Nazi soldier was killed in the village of Pešćenica.

References 

Populated places in Sisak-Moslavina County